Alain Eizmendi Blanco (born 10 June 1990) is a Spanish footballer who plays as a winger.

Club career
Born in Beasain, Basque Country, Eizmendi joined Real Sociedad's youth system in 2002, aged 12. He made his senior debut in the 2008–09 season, playing for the reserves in Segunda División B and being relegated. On 20 June 2009 he made his professional debut with the first team, coming on as a second-half substitute in a 2–1 away win against Elche CF in the Segunda División.

On 30 June 2011, Eizmendi rejected a contract extension and signed a two-year deal with neighbouring Athletic Bilbao, being assigned to B team also in the third tier. In his second year, he scored a career-best seven goals in 31 matches as they failed to promote in the playoffs. On 19 June 2013, he was released.

Eizmendi returned to Real Sociedad in July 2013, being subsequently loaned to SD Eibar. On 17 July 2014, after achieving promotion to La Liga, he agreed to a one-year contract at CD Leganés; he renewed his link with the latter club on 9 July of the following year, and won another promotion at the end of the season.

In the following years, expect for a fleeting spell in the Cypriot First Division with AEL Limassol, Eizmendi competed in the Spanish lower leagues. In September 2021, he joined his hometown side SD Beasain.

Personal life
Eizmendi's twin brother, Eneko, was also a footballer and a midfielder. He too was groomed at Real Sociedad, but spent all of his career in the lower leagues.

Their father, Francisco Javier, and uncle, José Ramón, were also involved in the sport.

Career statistics

Club

References

External links

1990 births
Living people
People from Beasain
Spanish twins
Twin sportspeople
Sportspeople from Gipuzkoa
Spanish footballers
Footballers from the Basque Country (autonomous community)
Association football wingers
Segunda División players
Segunda División B players
Tercera División players
Tercera Federación players
Real Sociedad B footballers
Real Sociedad footballers
Bilbao Athletic footballers
SD Eibar footballers
CD Leganés players
Real Unión footballers
Racing de Ferrol footballers
UE Costa Brava players
CD Guijuelo footballers
SD Beasain footballers
Cypriot First Division players
AEL Limassol players
Spanish expatriate footballers
Expatriate footballers in Cyprus
Spanish expatriate sportspeople in Cyprus